Colin Gordon Maggs (born 1932) is a railway historian and the author of more than 100 books about British railways, particularly those in the southwest of England.  He has also written many newspaper and magazine articles about them and made several TV appearances and radio broadcasts on the subject.

He was awarded an MBE in 1993 for services to railway history and an honorary MA from the University of Bath in 1995. A retired teacher, formerly deputy headmaster of Batheaston Church of England school, he lives in Bath, Somerset.

His publishers include Amberley (at Stroud, Gloucestershire), Halsgrove (Wellington, Somerset) and Countryside Books (Newbury, Berkshire).

Bibliography (partial) 

Bristol Port Railway and Pier (Oakwood library of railway history) (1975)
East Somerset Railway, 1858-1972 (1977)
Bath to Weymouth Line (Locomotion Papers) (1982)
Honeybourne Line (1985)
Birmingham to Gloucester Line (1986)
The Barnstaple and Ilfracombe Railway (Locomotion Papers) (1988)
The Calne Branch (1990)
The Last Years of the Somerset & Dorset (1991)
Branch Lines of Wiltshire (Transport/Railway) (1992)
The Bath Tramways (Locomotion Papers) (1992)
The Last Days of Steam in Bristol and Somerset (1992)
Sidmouth and Budleigh Salterton Branches (Locomotion Papers) (1996)
The Exeter and Exmouth Railway (Locomotion Papers) (1997)
Minehead Branch and West Somerset Railway (Locomotion Papers) (1998)
Steam: Tales from the Footplate (2000)
The Nailsworth and Stroud Branch (Locomotion Papers) (2000)
The Bristol to Bath Line (2001)
The Yate to Thornbury Branch (Locomotion Papers) (2002)
Rail Centres: Exeter No. 5 (2005)
Culm Valley Light Railway: Tiverton Junction to Hemyock (Locomotion Papers) (2006)
Swindon (Rail Centres) (2007)
Bristol (Rail Centres) (2008)
Britain's Railways in Colour: BR Steam in the 1950s and 1960s (2009)
Bristol & Bath Railways (2011)
Britain's Railways in Colour: BR Diesels in the 1960s and 70s (2010)
The Branch Lines of Buckinghamshire (2010)
The Branch Lines of Warwickshire (2011)
The Minehead Branch and the West Somerset Railway (Locomotion Papers) (2011)
The Branch Lines of Gloucestershire (2011)
The Branch Lines of Dorset (2012)
A History of the Great Western Railway (2013)

References

External links 
 https://archive.today/20130630200408/http://www.bookish.com/authors/colin-g-maggs-mbe/ce95444e-5176-4fe9-ad90-69928ef54870
 https://archive.today/20130630200329/http://amberleybooks.com/shop/article_9781848683426/The-Branch-Lines-of-Buckinghamshire%3CBR%3E%3CI%3EColin-G.-Maggs%3C_I%3E.html
 http://www.halsgrove.com/proddetail.php?prod=9781841149134

Living people
Rail transport writers
Railway historians
People from Bath, Somerset
Members of the Order of the British Empire
1932 births